Biawak (also known as Kampung Biawak) is a settlement in Lundu District, Sarawak, Malaysia.

The name biawak is the Malay word for big lizard such as monitor lizard, iguana etc. 

Neighbouring settlements include:

A border crossing into Indonesia is located near the settlement. The Malaysia immigration, customs, quarantine and security checkpoint is called the Biawak ICQS checkpoint while the Indonesian border crossing checkpoint is Aruk, located in Sambas Regency, West Kalimantan.

References

Lundu District
Populated places in Sarawak
Indonesia–Malaysia border crossings